Coleophora sittella is a moth of the family Coleophoridae. It is found in south-western and eastern China.

The wingspan is about 12–13 mm.

References

sittella
Moths of Asia
Moths described in 1989